Vasyl Mykhailov (born 24 June 1995) is a Ukrainian freestyle wrestler. He won one of the bronze medals in the 79kg event at the 2022 World Wrestling Championships held in Belgrade, Serbia. He also won one of the bronze medals in the 79 kg event at the 2020 European Wrestling Championships held in Rome, Italy. He represented Ukraine at the 2020 Summer Olympics in Tokyo, Japan.

Career 

In 2016, he won the silver medal in the men's 70 kg event at the World University Wrestling Championships held in Çorum, Turkey. A year later, he competed in the men's freestyle 74 kg event at the 2017 World Wrestling Championships held in Paris, France. In the same year, he won one of the bronze medals in the men's 74 kg event at the 2017 U23 World Wrestling Championships held in Bydgoszcz, Poland.

In 2019, he represented Ukraine at the World Beach Games in Doha, Qatar and he won the bronze medal in the men's 80 kg beach wrestling event.

In 2020, he won one of the bronze medals in the men's 79 kg event at the Individual Wrestling World Cup held in Belgrade, Serbia. In May 2021, he qualified at the World Olympic Qualification Tournament to represent Ukraine at the 2020 Summer Olympics in Tokyo, Japan. In June 2021, he won one of the bronze medals in the men's 79 kg event at the 2021 Waclaw Ziolkowski Memorial held in Warsaw, Poland.

He competed in the men's 74 kg event at the 2020 Summer Olympics held in Tokyo, Japan.

In 2022, he won the gold medal in his event at the Matteo Pellicone Ranking Series 2022 held in Rome, Italy. He won one of the bronze medals in the 79kg event at the 2022 World Wrestling Championships held in Belgrade, Serbia.

Achievements

References

External links 
 

Living people
1995 births
Ukrainian male sport wrestlers
Wrestlers at the 2019 European Games
European Games competitors for Ukraine
European Wrestling Championships medalists
World Wrestling Championships medalists
Wrestlers at the 2020 Summer Olympics
Olympic wrestlers of Ukraine
K. D. Ushinsky South Ukrainian National Pedagogical University alumni
Sportspeople from Odesa Oblast
20th-century Ukrainian people
21st-century Ukrainian people